Sănduleni is a commune in Bacău County, Western Moldavia, Romania. It is composed of seven villages: Bârzulești, Coman, Mateiești, Sănduleni, Stufu, Tisa and Verșești.

References

Communes in Bacău County
Localities in Western Moldavia